Richard P. Graves (October 1906 – June 6, 1989) was a veteran director of the League of California Cities. He became executive director in 1933.

Career
In 1954, he ran for Governor of California against incumbent Goodwin J. Knight. His campaign director was Pierre Salinger, who later served as JFK's press secretary. He later moved to Philadelphia where he started the Philadelphia Industrial Development Corp. After this he got involved in real estate. He would later return to Los Angeles, to continue his career in real estate. He also rode on Air Force One with President John F. Kennedy in December 1961.

Education
Graves was a graduate of the University of California, Berkeley in 1931.

Successes
A graduate of the University of California at Berkeley
Vice president of the Tishman Realty and Construction Company in Los Angeles from 1964 until his retirement in 1983
Vice president of the Philadelphia Industrial Development Corporation 
Executive director of the League of California Cities from 1933 to 1953

Death
Richard Perrin Graves died in his home of Pebble Beach, California at the age of 82 in the year of 1989.

References

1989 deaths
California Democrats
1906 births
People from Pebble Beach, California